Salauddin Sakil (born 7 July 1989) is a Bangladeshi cricketer. He made his List A debut for Prime Doleshwar Sporting Club in the 2017–18 Dhaka Premier Division Cricket League on 5 February 2018. He made his first-class debut for Central Zone in the 2017–18 Bangladesh Cricket League on 17 April 2018. He made his Twenty20 debut for Sheikh Jamal Dhanmondi Club in the 2018–19 Dhaka Premier Division Twenty20 Cricket League on 25 February 2019.

He was the leading wicket-taker for Sheikh Jamal Dhanmondi Club in the 2018–19 Dhaka Premier Division Cricket League tournament, with 18 dismissals in 13 matches. In June 2021, in the sixth round of the 2021 Dhaka Premier Division Twenty20 Cricket League, Sakil took a five-wicket haul, with 5/16.

References

External links
 

1989 births
Living people
Bangladeshi cricketers
Central Zone cricketers
Prime Doleshwar Sporting Club cricketers
Sheikh Jamal Dhanmondi Club cricketers
People from Munshiganj District